The 1949 Tierra del Fuego earthquakes occurred slightly more than eight hours apart on 17 December. Their epicenters were located in the east of the Chilean Tierra del Fuego Province, close to the Argentine border on the island of Tierra del Fuego.

The two shocks measured 7.7 and 7.6 on the moment magnitude scale and were the most powerful ever recorded in the south of Argentina and one of the most powerful in austral Chile. They were felt with intensities as high as VIII (Severe) on the Mercalli intensity scale, and affected the settlements of Punta Arenas and Río Gallegos.

See also
 List of earthquakes in 1949
 List of earthquakes in Chile
 List of earthquakes in Argentina

References

External links
  Instituto Nacional de Prevención Sísmica. Listado de Terremotos Históricos.
 

1949
1949 Tierra
History of Tierra del Fuego
History of Magallanes Region
Presidential Republic (1925–1973)
Tierra Del Fuego Earthquake, 1949
Tierra Del Fuego Earthquake, 1949
Tierra del Fuego, 1949
December 1949 events in South America